, also known as 5-Tōbun no Hanayome, is a television anime series based on shōnen manga series written and illustrated by Negi Haruba.

The anime series is licensed in North America under Crunchyroll-Funimation partnership. The anime television series adaptation was announced in the combined 36th and 37th issue of Weekly Shōnen Magazine on August 8, 2018. The series is directed by Satoshi Kuwabara and written by Keiichirō Ōchi,  featuring animation by Tezuka Productions, character designs by Michinosuke Nakamura and Gagakuga, and music by Natsumi Tabuchi, Hanae Nakamura, and Miki Sakurai. The series premiered from January 10 to March 28, 2019, on the TBS, SUN, and BS-TBS channels. The series ran for 12 episodes. Crunchyroll is streaming the series with Funimation providing the English dub.

Kana Hanazawa, Ayana Taketatsu, Miku Itō, Ayane Sakura, and Inori Minase performed the opening theme song  as the group , while Aya Uchida performed the ending theme song "Sign".



Episode list

Notes

References

External links

  
 
 The Quintessential Quintuplets (anime) at myanimelist.net/

2019 Japanese television seasons
The Quintessential Quintuplets episode lists